Mauro Maino (born ) is an Italian male curler and coach.

Record as a coach of national teams

References

External links

Living people
1966 births
Italian male curlers
Italian curling coaches